Francis Hesketh Prichard (30 October 1925 – 31 December 2014) was a British World War II arctic convoy Royal Navy officer and schoolteacher.

References

1925 births
2014 deaths
Royal Navy officers of World War II
Schoolteachers from Oxfordshire